Stubbe is a surname. Notable people with the surname include:

Christian Stubbe (born 1982), German archer
Hans Karl Oskar Stubbe (1902–1989), German agronomist and geneticist 
Henry Stubbe (1632–1676), English physician and scholar
Jaime Morgan Stubbe (graduated 1976), Puerto Rican businessman
JoAnne Stubbe (became professor 1987), American chemist
John Stubbs, also known as John Stubbe (c. 1543 – 1591), English pamphleteer
Peter Stumpp, also known as Peter Stubbe (died 1589), German farmer
Richard Stubbe (died 1619), English politician
Tom Stubbe (born 1981), Belgian cyclist

See also

Stubbe – Von Fall zu Fall, German television series
Stub (disambiguation) (includes Stubb)